Mark McKinnon (born 10 April 1960) is a New Zealand cricketer. He played in fourteen first-class matches for Northern Districts from 1983 to 1989.

See also
 List of Northern Districts representative cricketers

References

External links
 

1960 births
Living people
New Zealand cricketers
Northern Districts cricketers
Cricketers from Auckland